Chlamydastis argocymba is a moth of the family Depressariidae. It is found in Brazil.

The wingspan is 16–19 mm. The forewings are greyish-ochreous or light fuscous, sprinkled darker and with an elongate semi-oval white costal blotch extending from one-fifth to near the apex, margined beneath by dark fuscous suffusion. There is a toothed whitish-ochreous line around the apex and termen, the indentations filled with dark fuscous suffusion. The hindwings are grey.

References

Moths described in 1926
Chlamydastis